Alden Joseph Brown (born May 11, 1957), known professionally as Peter North, is a Canadian retired pornographic actor, director and producer. He has 2,588 credits as an actor (plus 13 as a director).

Career
In a 1996 interview published in North's hometown newspaper The Daily News, North stated that he was "discovered" while modeling athletic wear at a private party in Los Angeles in the early 1980s. A man within the adult film industry, whom North did not name, attended the party, was impressed by North's physique and gave him his business card.

North began his adult film career in 1983. Initially, North performed in gay pornography under the name Matt Ramsey. He transitioned to straight pornography soon after. North has appeared in over 2,000 adult films and also directed more than 70 films (notably, his North Pole and Anal Addicts series), most of them between 1998 and 2007. He has also produced over 20 films, including 15 in the North Pole series. In 2001, he successfully launched his own production company Northpole Entertainment. According to North's official website, he chose his stage name because "Your penis is also referred to as your Peter and when you are erect, it faces North. Plus, I am from the North."

North became involved in the U.S. government's 1986 investigation of Traci Lords' underage involvement in the industry. Lords was underage when she made most of her movies, including several sex scenes with North. The government eventually dropped the investigation. In a 1996 interview in Details magazine, North commented on his involvement in the scandal by saying: "Traci Lords didn't do much for me. She reeked sex, looked good and young. But I didn't know that she was that young. When the scandal broke, I thought it was a lot of baloney on her part. She knew what she was doing and she deceived a lot of people. She was sexually aggressive off camera to many people, so the whole 'innocence corrupted' scenario she came up with was a total farce."

In 1994, North published a guide to meeting and bedding beautiful women entitled Penetrating Insights.

North is a member of the X-Rated Critics Organization (XRCO) and the Adult Video News (AVN) Hall of Fame.
In 2004, North was featured in a book and film project Thinking XXX by photographer Timothy Greenfield-Sanders.

Personal life

Peter and Nadia North married in the summer of 2014; the couple have performed together in several adult videos.

On July 15, 2019, TMZ reported that Nadia North was granted a restraining order against her husband following two episodes of domestic violence in June of that year. One of the incidents reportedly left her with a concussion, and she alleges that there have been a total of about 20 such violent encounters with North.

Kenny Gallo incident
In his memoir, Breakshot: A Life in the 21st Century American Mafia (2009), Kenny Gallo recounts an altercation with North, which arose from North having starred as a bottom in homosexual pornographic films. Gallo stated that North was very sensitive about that particular period of his life and wished to keep it secret. Gallo stated he had received threatening phone calls from North in which North stated that Gallo "would pay" if he spread the information further. Gallo then set up a meeting with North in person to discuss the matter further. Gallo brought some back-up in the form of a "tattooed Nazi drug dealer" named "Speedy". Gallo and Speedy met up with North and threatened North with grievous bodily harm to his face and genitals. Gallo claims that, in the heat of the moment, he reached in his pocket for a knife but was stopped by Speedy before using it.

Awards
1990: F.O.X.E Male Fan Favorite
1991: F.O.X.E Male Fan Favorite
1992: F.O.X.E Male Fan Favorite
1998: AVN Best Group Scene – Video for Gluteus to the Maximus

See also 
List of actors in gay pornographic films
gay-for-pay

References

External links

1957 births
Living people
Canadian pornographic film directors
Canadian pornographic film producers
Directors of gay pornographic films
Producers of gay pornographic films
Canadian people of Scottish descent
Canadian male pornographic film actors
Canadian actors in gay pornographic films
Male actors from Halifax, Nova Scotia